There have been five baronetcies created for members of the Bowyer family, a political family in the UK: three in the Baronetage of England, one in the Baronetage of Great Britain and one in the Baronetage of the United Kingdom. Three of the titles are extinct while the remaining extant baronetcies have been united in one holder. The Bowyer Baronets are all descended from Thomas Bowyer who late in the 14th century married Katherine de Knypersley of Knypersley Hall in Staffordshire.

 Bowyer baronets of Leighthorne, Sussex (1627)
 Bowyer baronets of Denham Court (1660): see Baron Denham
 Bowyer baronets of Knipersley, Staffordshire (1660)
 Bowyer baronets of Radley (1794): see Baron Denham
 Bowyer baronets of Weston Underwood: see Baron Denham

See also
 Bowyer-Smyth baronets
 Goring baronets

Set index articles on titles of nobility